The parvocellular red nucleus (RNp) is located in the rostral midbrain and is involved in motor coordination.  Together with the magnocellular red nucleus, it makes up the red nucleus.

References

Midbrain
Brainstem nuclei